Robert Jocelyn, 4th Earl of Roden (22 November 1846 – 10 January 1880), styled The Honourable Robert Jocelyn until 1854 and Viscount Jocelyn from 1854 to 1870, was an Anglo-Irish Conservative politician.

Roden was the eldest son of Robert Jocelyn, Viscount Jocelyn, eldest son of Robert Jocelyn, 3rd Earl of Roden. His mother was Lady Frances Elizabeth Clavering-Cowper, daughter of Peter Cowper, 5th Earl Cowper. He was educated at Eton College and Trinity College, Cambridge, graduating B.A. in 1868. He gained the courtesy title of Viscount Jocelyn on his father's death in 1854.

By 1876, as reported in his Vanity Fair Caricature text he had already retired from the Life Guards.

Jocelyn succeeded his grandfather in the earldom in 1870. In 1874 he was appointed a Lord-in-waiting (government whip in the House of Lords) in the second Conservative administration of Benjamin Disraeli, a post he held until 1880.

Lord Roden died in office in January 1880, aged only 33. He was unmarried and was succeeded in the earldom by his uncle, the Honourable John Strange Jocelyn, 5th Earl of Roden.

Notes

References
Kidd, Charles, Williamson, David (editors). Debrett's Peerage and Baronetage (1990 edition). New York: St Martin's Press, 1990,

External links

Vanity fair caricature of Lord Roden at the National Portrait Gallery

1846 births
1880 deaths
People educated at Eton College
Earls of Roden